Franck Biancheri (born 2 May 1960) is a Monegasque businessman and former foreign and finance minister of Monaco.

Early life and education
Biancheri was born on 2 May 1960. He graduated from ESCP, Paris Business School.

Career
Biancheri served as minister of finance and economy from 2000 until July 2006. He rejoined the Council of Government as the minister of foreign affairs from 2008 to 2011. He also served as Monaco’s economic development minister. He has been the CEO of Monaco QD Hotels and Resorts Management.

References

1960 births
Finance ministers of Monaco
Foreign ministers of Monaco
Monegasque businesspeople
Living people
ESCP Europe alumni